Frédérik Durand (born 4 May 1988), professionally known as SNAILS, is a DJ and music producer from Montreal, Canada.

Durand's musical style has been described as "vomitstep", featuring "guttural bass gurgles, crushing 808s and synthesizers oscillated well past the point of absurdity" according to Billboard.

Career

Early career
Durand's first tracks, including his debut release "Bubble Gun", appeared online in 2012 through Canadian label Kannibalen Records.

Rising success
Durand continued to gain success, collaborating with artists like Flux Pavilion and Jack Ü and frequent plays from Skrillex and other notable DJs. In 2014, Snails released two singles, "Wild" and "Pump This", and made his first US concert appearances.

In 2015, Durand performed at EDC Las Vegas, Ultra Music Festival and Electric Forest, and released a single titled "King Is Back".

Durand continued steadily releasing music through multiple labels, including several releases on Skrillex's Owsla imprint.

2016–present: Tours and continued success

In early 2016, Durand embarked on the North American Enter Slugz City Tour as direct support for Flosstradamus, as well as playing festival sets at Coachella, Lollapalooza and Ultra Music Festival. Durand also briefly toured Asia, performing at numerous venues and festivals in China, Japan, and Taiwan. To close out 2016, Durand toured through Australia with Jauz and Slushii on the Touch Bass traveling festival.

The final Snails show of 2016 took place in Denver, Colorado at Decadence Music Festival, where he announced that he would be throwing his own festival, Sluggtopia, at Red Rocks in October 2017.

In May 2017, Durand and fellow electronic musician Botnek released their collaboratory single "Waffle House" on OWSLA, along with a music video. A couple of months later, in August, he participated in the making of the song of KSHMR '' The Serpent '' in his last EP called Materia.

On 29 August 2017, Snails released the song "Into the Light" as well as releasing the title of his new upcoming album titled The Shell.

Discography

Albums

Extended plays

Singles 
 2018: "Snailephant" (with Wooli)
 2018: "Follow Me" (with Adventure Club featuring Sara Diamond)
 2019: "Jackhammer" (with Krimer)
 2019: "RKO" (featuring Rico Act)
 2019: "Snailclops" (with Subtronics)
 2021: "Slime Zone"

Remixes 
 2021: Hi I'm Ghost — "Death Rail" (Snails Slime Rail Remix)

References 

1988 births
Living people
Canadian DJs
Canadian electronic musicians
Musicians from Quebec
People from Lanaudière
Monstercat artists
Owsla artists
Electronic dance music DJs